Piemare was one of the main Curonian kihelkonds with an administrative center in Esestua (Seeburg) before the 13th century. It was located between Bandava, Duvzare and the Baltic Sea on the territory of present Liepāja district in Latvia. Toponyms were named in partition agreement between the Bishop of Courland and the Livonian Order in 1253. The territory included the following settlements: Vārtaja, Tadaiķi, Ūsaiķi, Ilga, Līpa, Gavieze, Vārve, Padone, Peke, Okte, Ģelži, Lindale, Troista, Ievade, Dzēre, Boja, Droga, Krote, Apriķi, Ilmede, Diždupļi, Mazdupļi, Grobiņa, Neres, Stroķi, Tāši, Aistere, Vērgale, Rīva, Medze, Līva, Razge, Perkone, Dunalka, Prūši, Karkele, Dzintere, Saliena and Saka.

References

Bibliography 

1253 disestablishments in Europe
Historical regions in Latvia